Nednapa Chommuak (born 9 August 1971) is a Thai sprinter. She competed in the women's 200 metres at the 1992 Summer Olympics.

References

1971 births
Living people
Athletes (track and field) at the 1992 Summer Olympics
Nednapa Chommuak
Nednapa Chommuak
Place of birth missing (living people)
Asian Games medalists in athletics (track and field)
Nednapa Chommuak
Nednapa Chommuak
Athletes (track and field) at the 1990 Asian Games
Athletes (track and field) at the 1994 Asian Games
Medalists at the 1990 Asian Games
Medalists at the 1994 Asian Games
Olympic female sprinters
Nednapa Chommuak